Dragan is a popular Serbo-Croatian masculine given name derived from the common Slavic element drag meaning "dear, beloved". The feminine form is Dragana.

People named Dragan include:

Politicians and office holders
Dragan Čavić, Bosnian Serb politician
Dragan Čović, Croat politician in Bosnia and Herzegovina
Dragan Đilas, Serbian politician and businessman
Dragan Đokanović, Bosnian Serb politician
Dragan Đorđević, Serbian politician
Dragan Jočić, Serbian politician
Dragan Kojadinović, Serbian journalist, politician and Minister of Culture
Dragan Marković, Serbian politician
Dragan Maršićanin, Serbian politician
Dragan Mikerević, Bosnian Serb politician
Dragan Primorac, Croatian scientist and politician
Dragan Šutanovac, Serbian Minister of Defense
Dragan Todorović (politician), Serbian politician
Dragan Tomić, Serbian politician, acting President of Serbia in 1997
Dragan Tsankov, Bulgarian politician, twice Prime Minister
Dragan Vulin, Croatian politician and scientist

Soldiers
Dragan Nikolić, Serbian military officer 
Dragan Paskaš, Serbian general
Dragan Vasiljković, Serbian paramilitary officer

Athletes
Dragan Antanasijević (born 1987), Serbian footballer
Dragan Bender (born 1997), Croatian basketball player in the Israeli Basketball Premier League
Dragan Blatnjak (born 1981), Bosnian footballer
Dragan Bogavac, Montenegrin footballer
Dragan Ćirić, Serbian footballer
Dragan Džajić, retired Serbian footballer
Dragan Dimitrovski, Macedonian footballer
Dragan Dragutinović, Serbian footballer
Dragan Džajić, Yugoslavian footballer
Dragan Glogovac, Bosnian Serb footballer
Dragan Holcer, Yugoslavian footballer
Dragan Jović, Bosnian football coach
Dragan Jovanović, Yugoslavian footballer
Dragan Kanatlarovski, Yugoslavian/Macedonian footballer and manager
Dragan Kićanović, retired Serbian basketball player
Dragan Kokotović, Serbian footballer and manager
Dragan Lukovski, Serbian basketball player
Dragan Milosavljević, Serbian basketball player
Dragan Mladenović (footballer) (born 1976), Serbian footballer
Dragan Mrđa, Serbian footballer
Dragan Mustapić, Croatian discus thrower
Dragan Načevski, Macedonian footballer
Dragan Okuka, Serbian footballer and manager
Dragan Pantelić, Yugoslavian/Serbian footballer
Dragan Perić, retired Serbian Olympic athlete
Dragan Popović, Yugoslavian footballer and coach
Dragan Punišić, Yugoslavian/Serbian footballer
Dragan Raca, Serbian basketball coach
Dragan Radojičić, Serbian/Montenegrin footballer and manager
Dragan Stančić, Serbian footballer
Dragan Stojisavljević, Serbian footballer
Dragan Stojkov, Macedonian footballer
Dragan Stojković, retired Serbian footballer and current manager
Dragan Talajić, Croatian footballer and manager
Dragan Tarlać, retired Serbian basketball player
Dragan Tešanović (born 1985), Serbian mixed martial arts fighter
Dragan Travica, Croatian naturalized Italian volleyball player.
Dragan Umicevic, Swedish ice hockey player 
Dragan Žarković, Serbian footballer
Dragan Zorić, Serbian sprint canoer

Artists and entertainers
Dragan Bjelogrlić, Serbian actor
Dragan Espenschied, German musician and artist
Dragan Kojić Keba, Gipsy/Serbian folk singer
Dragan Marinković, Bosnian Serb actor and TV personality
Dragan Mićanović, Serbian actor
Dragan Nikolić, Serbian actor
Dragan Malesevic Tapi, Serbian painter and Freemason
Dragan Roganović, renowned Serbian-Australian music producer and DJ
Dragan Todorović, Yugoslavian writer, journalist, and artist

References

Slavic masculine given names
Masculine given names
Bosnian masculine given names
Bulgarian masculine given names
Croatian masculine given names
Macedonian masculine given names
Montenegrin masculine given names
Serbian masculine given names
Ukrainian masculine given names

pl:Dragan